The following is a list of Saturniidae of Nepal. Twenty-three different species are listed.

This list is primarily based on Colin Smith's 2010 "Lepidoptera of Nepal", which is based on Toshiro Haruta's "Moths of Nepal (Vol. 1-6)" with some recent additions and a modernized classification.

Attacus atlas
Archaeoattacus edwardsii
Samia canningi
Actias maenas
Actias selene
Antheraea assamensis
Antheraea frithi
Antheraea frithi f. pedunculata
Antheraea helferi f. pernyi
Antheraea helferi f. roylei
Loepa diversiocellata
Loepa katinka
Loepa miranda
Loepa sikkima
Rhodinia newara
Cricula trifenestrata
Caligula anna
Caligula grotei
Caligula lindia
Caligula simla
Caligula thibeta
Saturnia zuleika
Saturnia cidosa
Salassa lola
Salassa royi

See also
List of butterflies of Nepal
Odonata of Nepal
Cerambycidae of Nepal
Zygaenidae of Nepal
Wildlife of Nepal

References

 01
Saturniidae
Insects of Nepal